Alan Edwin Baxter (November 19, 1908 – May 7, 1976) was an American film and television actor.

Early years
Baxter was born in East Cleveland, Ohio. He earned a bachelor's degree from Williams College, where he was a member of Phi Sigma Kappa fraternity and a classmate of Elia Kazan. He went on to study in the 47 Drama Workshop at Yale University.

Stage
After he completed his studies, Baxter became a member of the Group Theatre in New York City. His Broadway credits include The Hallams (1947), Home of the Brave (1945), The Voice of the Turtle (1943), Winged Victory (1943), Thumbs Up! (1934), and Lone Valley (1932).

Military service 
Baxter served in the United States Army Air Corps during World War II.

Personal life
Baxter had been married to actress Barbara Williams for 17 years at the time of her death on November 9, 1953. Later, he was married to Christy Palmer until his death.

Filmography

 Mary Burns, Fugitive (1935) – 'Babe' Wilson (film debut)
 The Trail of the Lonesome Pine (1936) – Clayt Tolliver
 Big Brown Eyes (1936) – Cary Butler
 Thirteen Hours by Air (1936) – Curtis Palmer
 The Case Against Mrs. Ames (1936) – Lou
 Parole! (1936) – Percy 'Okay' Smith
 Breezing Home (1937) – Joe Montgomery
 Wide Open Faces (1937) – Danny Haines
 Night Key (1937) – John Baron aka The Kid
 It Could Happen to You (1937) – Bob Ames
 The Last Gangster (1937) – Acey Kile
 Big Town Girl (1937) – James Mead
 I Met My Love Again (1938) – Tony
 Wide Open Faces (1938) – Tony
 Gangs of New York (1938) – 'Dapper' Mallare
 Off the Record (1939) – Joe Fallon
 Boy Slaves (1939) – Graff
 My Son Is a Criminal (1939) – Tim Halloran Jr.
 Let Us Live (1939) – Joe Linden
 Each Dawn I Die (1939) – Carlisle
 In Name Only (1939) – Charley
 Abe Lincoln in Illinois (1940) – Billy Herndon
 The Lone Wolf Strikes (1940) – Jim Ryder
 Free, Blonde and 21 (1940) – Mickey Ryan
 Escape to Glory (1940) – Larry Perrin, alias Larry Ross
 The Man Who Talked Too Much (1940) – Joe Garland
 Santa Fe Trail (1940) – Oliver Brown
 Under Age (1941) – Tap Manson
 Bad Men of Missouri (1941) – Jesse James
 Rags to Riches (1941) – Jimmy Rogers
 The Pittsburgh Kid (1941) – Joe Barton
 Shadow of the Thin Man (1941) – 'Whitey' Barrow
 Borrowed Hero (1941) – Roger Andrews
 Saboteur (1942) – Mr. Freeman
 Prisoner of Japan (1942) – David Bowman
 Stand By All Networks (1942) – Victor
 China Girl (1942) – Bill Jones
 The Human Comedy (1943) – Brad Stickman
 Behind Prison Walls (1943) – Jonathan MacGlennon
 Pilot No. 5 (1943) – Winston Davis
 Submarine Base (1943) – Joe Morgan
 Women in Bondage (1943) – Otto Bracken
 Winged Victory (1944) – Maj. Halper
 The Prairie (1947) – Paul Hover
 Close-Up (1948) – Phil Sparr
 The Set-Up (1949) – Little Boy
 She Shoulda Said No! (1949) – Markey
 The True Story of Jesse James (1957) – Barney Remington
 The End of the Line (1957) – Mike Selby
 The Restless Years (1958) – Alex Fisher
 The Restless Gun (1958) as George Frazier in Episode "The Torn Flag"
 Face of a Fugitive (1959) – Reed Williams
 The Mountain Road (1960) – Gen. Loomis
 Judgment at Nuremberg (1961) – Brig. Gen. Matt Merrin
 This Property Is Condemned (1966) – Knopke
 Assault on a Queen (1966) – Larry – Crewman (uncredited)
 Welcome to Hard Times (1967) – Jack Millay
 Paint Your Wagon (1969) – Mr. Fenty
 Chisum (1970) – Gov. Sam Axtell
 Willard (1971) – Walter T. Spencer
 Escape from the Planet of the Apes (1971) – Military Officer (uncredited)

Television roles
Among Baxter's television appearances were four guest roles on the CBS' courtroom drama series, Perry Mason.  In 1961, he played the title role of Eugene Houseman in "The Case of the Left-Handed Liar". Also in 1961    Gunsmoke “Long, Long Trail” he played Lou Hacker and Maverick “Flood's Folly” he played Judge John Scott. In 1964, he played Roger Gray in “The Case of the Missing Button”.  He also made three guest appearances on The Virginian, and he was guest starred on Ripcord, as Leach in the episode "Derelict". In September 1960, he appeared in the season premiere episode "The Longest Rope" of the western series Cheyenne.   In 1961 he appeared on Thriller in the season 2, episode “Waxworks” playing Sergeant Dane. He also played Detective Baldwin on Alfred Hitchcock Hour in “The Crimson Witness”. In 1963, he played Colonel Grover in the episode O.B.I.T. on The Outer Limits.

References

External links 
 
 
 Alan Baxter in Submarine Base from YouTube

1908 births
1976 deaths
American male film actors
Male actors from Cleveland
20th-century American male actors
Williams College alumni
Yale School of Drama alumni
United States Army Air Forces personnel of World War II